Thunderstrike may refer to:
 Thunderstrike (Eric Masterson), a Marvel Comics character
 Thunderstrike (Kevin Masterson), a Marvel Comics 2 character
 Thunderstrike (video game), a 1990 computer game by Millennium Interactive
 AH-3 Thunderstrike, a video game released by Core Design in 1992
 Thunderstrike 2, a video game released by Core Design in 1995
 Thunderstrike: Operation Phoenix, a video game released by Core Design in 2001

See also
 Lightning strike, an electric discharge between the atmosphere and the ground
 Thunderstruck (disambiguation)